The first season of the Canadian reality competition show Top Chef Canada was broadcast on Food Network in Canada. It is a Canadian spin-off of Bravo's hit show Top Chef. In the first season, 16 chefs competed against each other in weekly challenges. The program took place in Toronto. In the season finale that premiered on July 4, 2011, Dale MacKay was crowned Top Chef Canada.

Contestants
Sixteen chefs competed in season one. Names, ages, hometowns, and cities of residence (at time of filming) are from the Food Network Canada website. In the order eliminated:

 Michael Stauffer, 30, Dundas, ON
 Clayton Beadle, 26, Whistler, BC
 Rebekah Pearse, 29, Calgary, AB
 Steve Gonzales, 35, Toronto, ON
 Derek Bocking, 30, Montreal, QC
 Jamie Hertz, 31, Nelson, BC
 Chris Kanka, 34, Toronto, ON
 Patrick Wiese, 40, Toronto, ON
 Todd Perrin, 40, Quidi Vidi Village, St. John's, NL
 Darryl Crumb, 29, Winnipeg, MB
 Andrea Nicholson, 28, Toronto, ON
 Francois Gagnon, 32, Montreal, QC
 Dustin Gallagher, 28, Toronto, ON
 Connie DeSousa, 29, Calgary, AB
 Rob Rossi, 27, Toronto, ON
 Dale MacKay, 30, Saskatoon, SK

Contestant progress

: Eliminated by placing last in the Quickfire Challenge.
: Although in the bottom, Chris had won immunity in the quickfire challenge, so he was not eligible to be eliminated.
: Although in the bottom, Dustin had won immunity in the quickfire challenge, so he was not eligible to be eliminated.
: In the knife pull, Francois pulled "Hog Wild", guaranteeing immunity, while the Black Team finished the relay first and gained an extra hundred dollars in their budget.
 (WINNER) The chef won the season and was crowned Top Chef.
 (RUNNER-UP) The chef was a runner-up for the season.
 (THIRD-PLACE) The chef placed third in the competition.
 (WIN) The chef won that episode's Elimination Challenge.
 (HIGH) The chef was selected as one of the top entries in the Elimination Challenge, but did not win.
 (LOW) The chef was selected as one of the bottom entries in the Elimination Challenge, but was not eliminated.
 (OUT) The chef lost that week's Elimination Challenge and was out of the competition.
 (IN) The chef neither won nor lost that week's Elimination Challenge. They also were not up to be eliminated.

Episodes
Each episode includes two challenges. The Quickfire Challenge is a short, simple challenge with a varying reward each week. In the initial episodes of the season, it usually guarantees the winner immunity from being sent home that week; however, in the latter stages, the Quickfire winner is given an advantage in the upcoming Elimination Challenge. It also has been made clear that Quickfire winners this season may receive other rewards, including cash prizes. The Elimination Challenge is a more complex challenge that determines who goes home. One or more judges join the show each week to evaluate both the Quickfire and Elimination challenges. Each week's elimination is announced in a segment called "Judges' Table." Each week of season one featured a guest judge or special guest, such as Dan Aykroyd, Susur Lee, Daniel Boulud, Rob Feenie, and recurring judge on the American version, Gail Simmons.

References

Canada, Season 1
2011 Canadian television seasons